Milios is the name of:

 John Milios (born 1952), Greek political economist
 Nikos Milios (born 1995), Greek footballer
 Spyros Milios (1800–1880), Greek revolutionary
 Zachos Milios (1805–1860), Greek revolutionary

See also
 Nancy Milio
 Milio's Sandwiches